Thosea cervina is a moth of the family Limacodidae first described by Frederic Moore in 1877. It is found in Sri Lanka and India.

In the male, the upperside is a greenish fawn colour. Forewing with a transverse discal narrow, which is slightly curved to a dark brown band. There is a black spot at end of cell. Underside uniform brownish. There is a white spot at antennae base and on fore tibia.

References

Moths of Asia
Moths described in 1877
Limacodidae
Lepidoptera of India
Moths of Sri Lanka